Hajime Ishimaru (1890–1990) was a Japanese painter. Her work was part of the painting event in the art competition at the 1936 Summer Olympics.

References

1890 births
1990 deaths
20th-century Japanese painters
Japanese women painters
Olympic competitors in art competitions
People from Tokushima Prefecture